Péter Rajczi (born 3 April 1981) is a Hungarian footballer who currently plays as a striker for USV Neulengbach.

Career
Rajczi started to play football in Kaposvár, playing for Kaposvári Rákóczi FC. He played many seasons with Rákóczi, and scored a number of goals, reaching the topscorer title once in the second division. In 2003, he was signed by Újpest FC, where he became one of the most respected Hungarian strikers. Rajczi won two silver medals in the championship with Újpest.

Péter Rajczi became the topscorer of the Hungarian league in the 2005/06 season by scoring 23 goals in 24 games.

He joined Barnsley F.C. on 29 January 2007, for a substantial loan amount, and has the option to sign permanently in the summer.

He made his debut as a substitute in Barnsley's game with Cardiff City F.C. on 2 February 2007. Rajczi scored his only Barnsley F.C. goal against Hull City on 20 February 2007.

At the end of the 2006/2007 season Rajczi returned from loan to Hungary and joined Újpest FC again.
After a season spent at Pisa Calcio in the Italian Serie B, he currently plays for Újpest FC.

International goals

Honours
Hungarian Top Goalscorer: 2006
Player of the Year in Hungary: 2006

References

External links

Rajczi and Ferenczi fan site (In English)

1981 births
Living people
People from Lengyeltóti
Hungarian footballers
Association football forwards
Hungary international footballers
Kaposvári Rákóczi FC players
Újpest FC players
Barnsley F.C. players
Pisa S.C. players
Kecskeméti TE players
Mezőkövesdi SE footballers
Kisvárda FC players
III. Kerületi TUE footballers
Nemzeti Bajnokság I players
Serie B players
Hungarian expatriate footballers
Expatriate footballers in England
Expatriate footballers in Italy
Hungarian expatriate sportspeople in England
Hungarian expatriate sportspeople in Italy
Nemzeti Bajnokság II players
Sportspeople from Somogy County